Pseudomogrus logunovi is a species of jumping spider in the genus Pseudomogrus that lives in the United Arab Emirates. The species was first described in 2010. The species was previously known as Yllenus logunovi, but was moved to the genus Logunyllus in 2016 and then subsequently to Pseudomogrus in 2019.

References

Salticidae
Spiders described in 2010
Spiders of Asia
Taxa named by Wanda Wesołowska